Walter Martin Burke (born 12 March 1981) is an Irish hurler who played as a right corner-back for the Kilkenny senior team.

Burke joined the team during the 2002 championship and was a regular member of the team until his retirement from inter-county hurling after three seasons. During that time he won two All-Ireland winners' medals as a non-playing substitute.

At club level Burke plays with the Mullinavat club.

References

1981 births
Living people
Mullinavat hurlers
Kilkenny inter-county hurlers